The 4th Pennsylvania Regiment, first known as the 3rd Pennsylvania Battalion, was raised on December 9, 1775, at Philadelphia, Pennsylvania, for service with the Continental Army. The regiment was assigned to Thomas Mifflin's brigade in the main army on June 26, 1776. Part of the unit was captured at Fort Washington on November 16, 1776. The regiment fought at Brandywine, Paoli, Germantown, Monmouth and the Sullivan Expedition. The regiment was furloughed January 17, 1781, at Trenton, New Jersey and disbanded on January 1, 1783.

External links
Bibliography of the Continental Army in Pennsylvania compiled by the United States Army Center of Military History

Pennsylvania regiments of the Continental Army
Military units and formations established in 1775
Military units and formations disestablished in 1783